Karin Maag (born 13 June 1962) is a German politician of the Christian Democratic Union (CDU) who served as a member of the Bundestag from the state of Baden-Württemberg from 2009 to 2021.

Early career 
From 2004 until 2007, Maag served as chief of staff to Wolfgang Schuster in his role as Lord Mayor of Stuttgart. She later headed the administration of the State Parliament of Baden-Württemberg from 2007 until 2009.

Political career 
Maag first became a member of the Bundestag after the 2009 German federal election. She is a member of the Health Committee. Since 2018, she has been serving as her parliamentary group's spokeswoman on health policy.

In addition to her committee assignments, Maag is part of the German-Egyptian Parliamentary Friendship Group, the German-Indian Parliamentary Friendship Group and the German-Russian Parliamentary Friendship Group.

In the negotiations to form a coalition government under the leadership of Chancellor Angela Merkel following the 2017 federal elections, Maag was part of the working group on health policy, led by Hermann Gröhe, Georg Nüßlein and Malu Dreyer.

In April 2021, Maag announced that she would not stand in that year's federal elections but instead resign from active politics by the end of the parliamentary term.

Other activities

Corporate boards 
 Barmenia, Member of the Advisory Board

Non-profit organizations 
 Foundation "Remembrance, Responsibility and Future", Member of the Board of Trustees 
 Federal Agency for Civic Education (BPB), Alternate Member of the Board of Trustees (–2021)
 Humanitarian Aid Foundation for Persons infected with HIV through blood products (HIV Foundation), Chairwoman of the Board
 ZNS – Hannelore Kohl Stiftung, Member of the Advisory Board

Political positions 
In June 2017, Maag voted against Germany's introduction of same-sex marriage.

Ahead of the 2021 national elections, Maag endorsed Markus Söder as the Christian Democrats' joint candidate to succeed Chancellor Angela Merkel.

References

External links 

  
 Bundestag biography 

1962 births
Living people
Members of the Bundestag for Baden-Württemberg
Female members of the Bundestag
21st-century German women politicians
Members of the Bundestag 2017–2021
Members of the Bundestag 2013–2017
Members of the Bundestag 2009–2013
Members of the Bundestag for the Christian Democratic Union of Germany